Patrick Stevens (born July 15, 1979 in Alphen aan den Rijn) is a Dutch taekwondo practitioner, who competed in the men's welterweight category. He yielded three medals (one silver and two bronze) in the 84-kg division at the European Championships between 2002 and 2005, and represented his nation Netherlands at the 2004 Summer Olympics.

Stevens qualified for the two-member Dutch taekwondo squad in the men's welterweight class (80 kg) at the 2004 Summer Olympics in Athens, by placing third and granting a berth from the European Olympic Qualifying Tournament in Baku, Azerbaijan. He crashed out in the opening match to the French taekwondo jin Christophe Negrel with a score of 10–13. With Negrel being defeated by Azerbaijan's Rashad Ahmadov in the quarterfinal, Stevens denied his chance to compete for the Olympic bronze medal through the repechage.

References

External links
 
 
 

1979 births
Living people
Dutch male taekwondo practitioners
Olympic taekwondo practitioners of the Netherlands
Taekwondo practitioners at the 2004 Summer Olympics
Sportspeople from Alphen aan den Rijn
European Taekwondo Championships medalists
20th-century Dutch people
21st-century Dutch people